George I (? – January or February 686) was the Ecumenical Patriarch of Constantinople from 679 to 686. He was succeeded, after a one-year bishopric and interlude of a reign by patriarch Theodore I of Constantinople, by His All-Holiness Paul III of Constantinople.

References 

7th-century patriarchs of Constantinople